The Division of Martin was an Australian Electoral Division in the state of New South Wales. It was located in the inner western suburbs of Sydney, and initially included the suburbs of Concord and Mortlake, although by the time it was abolished in 1955, it had moved to cover Abbotsford, Balmain and Drummoyne.

The Division was named after Hon Sir James Martin, a former Premier of New South Wales. It was proclaimed at the redistribution of 13 September 1922, and was first contested at the 1922 Federal election. It was abolished at the redistribution of 30 August 1955. The seat was at one stage held by William Holman, a former Premier of New South Wales.

Members

Election results

Martin